The Bangladesh–Myanmar border is the international border between the countries of Bangladesh and Myanmar (formerly Burma). The border stretches , from the tripoint with India in the north, to the Bay of Bengal in the south. About  of the border is fenced, with the government of Myanmar announcing in 2017 that it was planning to fence off the rest of the border.

Description
The border starts in the north at the tripoint with Mizoram, India. It then proceeds southwards overland, before turning west at a point west of Paletwa. The border then proceeds to the west, north-west and then south in a broad arc before reaching the Naf River. The border then follows this wide river southwards out to the Bay of Bengal.

History
Historically the border region has been a contested area located at the edge of the various Indian and Burmese empires. Britain had begun conquering India (including modern Bangladesh) in the 17th century, and gradually took control of most of the country, forming British India. From the 1820s-80s Britain also gradually conquered Burma; by the Treaty of Yandabo in 1826 which ended the First Anglo-Burmese War Burma recognised British control over Assam, Manipur, Rakhine (Arakan), and the Taninthayi coast, thereby delimiting much of the Indo-Burmese modern boundary in general terms. Large swathes of Burma were annexed following the Second Anglo-Burmese War of 1852–53. The remainder of Burma was conquered in 1885 and incorporated into British India. Further Indo-Burmese boundary modifications were made in 1894, 1896, 1901, 1921 and 1922.

In 1937 Burma was split off from India and became a separate colony. In 1947 India gained independence, however the country was split into two states (India and Pakistan), with the southernmost section of the Burma-India border becoming that between Burma and East Pakistan (modern Bangladesh). Burma gained independence in 1948. In 1971 Bangladesh gained independence from Pakistan after a war and thereby inherited the border with Burma/Myanmar.

Since then the boundary area has often been unstable owing to armed conflicts such as the Chittagong Hill Tracts conflict (1977-1997) in south-east Bangladesh and the Rohingya conflict in Myanmar's Rakhine state. The latter has been ongoing for decades, yet has reached a particular intensity since 2016. The latest round of fighting has resulted in Rohingya refugees crossing the border from Myanmar into Bangladesh. Bangladesh and Myanmar have agreed to close their borders during sudden influxes of Rohingya refugees. On Myanmar's side of the border in Maungdaw District, 80 percent of the population is Rohingya. In 2014 members of the Myanmar Border Police opened fire on a Border Guards Bangladesh (BGB) patrol, killing one. In 2015 an armed clash occurred on the border between the Rohingya Arakan Army and the BGB. There have also been a number of incidents down the years involving fishermen on the Naf river allegedly illegally crossing the boundary.

Border crossings
At present the border is closed to foreign nationals.

See also
 2022 Bangladesh-Myanmar border tensions
 Bangladesh–Myanmar relations

References

 
Fences
Border barriers
Borders of Bangladesh
Borders of Myanmar
International borders